Jim Higgins (25 October 1897 – 26 November 1964) born in Hamilton was a Scottish professional bantam/featherweight boxer of the 1910s, 1920s  and 1930s who won the National Sporting Club (NSC) (subsequently known as the British Boxing Board of Control (BBBofC)) British bantamweight title, and inaugural British Empire bantamweight title, and was a challenger for the Scottish Area bantamweight title against Elky Clark (twice), and European Boxing Union (EBU) bantamweight title against Charles Ledoux, his professional fighting weight varied from , i.e. bantamweight to , i.e. featherweight.

References

External links

Image - Jim Higgins

1897 births
1964 deaths
Bantamweight boxers
Featherweight boxers
Sportspeople from Hamilton, South Lanarkshire
Place of death missing
Scottish male boxers
WWW.HISTORIC-HAMILTON.CO.UK
Historic Hamilton website & Facebook Page